Ari Football or Ari is a Thai company which sells football equipment. It is known for its lifestyle focus, catering to enthusiasts, with over ten branches in Bangkok and elsewhere, as of 2016. The company was founded in 2009 by a group of friends with a passion for the sport. It started as a retail store, and later expanded to manufacturing custom items, supplying kits for Bangkok United beginning in 2014.

Sponsorships

Football

Club teams

Asia 

  Hougang United FC
  Bangkok United
  Port FC

Europe

References

External links 
 

Shoe brands
Swimwear manufacturers
Sportswear brands
Clothing companies of Thailand
Companies based in Bangkok
Clothing companies established in 2009